Pico station is an at-grade light rail station on the Los Angeles Metro Rail system located on Flower Street at the intersection of Pico Boulevard. The station also has southbound bus stops on Flower Street, across from the station and northbound bus stops on Figueroa Street, one block to the west. Pico station serves the South Park and Figueroa/Convention District neighborhoods.

Officially named Pico/Chick Hearn station after Chick Hearn, the longtime play-by-play announcer for the Los Angeles Lakers, it was also temporarily renamed "Kobe station" to commemorate professional basketball player Kobe Bryant's last game on April 13, 2016. It was once again temporarily renamed "LeBron Station" to welcome LeBron James to the Lakers.

History 
Pico station opened along with the Blue Line (now A Line) on July 14, 1990, and was the site of opening day celebrations. Because the underground portion of the line was not yet complete, this station served as the northern terminus for the line until February 1991 when 7th St/Metro Center Station opened.

During the 2028 Summer Olympics, the station will serve spectators traveling to events at the Los Angeles Convention Center, Crypto.com Arena and Microsoft Theater.

Service

Station layout 

Pico station has an at-grade, island platform station designed to accommodate Metro light rail vehicles. The station's entrance is on the northeast corner of Flower/Pico.

Metro added gates and flashing lights at this station during late December 2011, as part of a set of safety enhancements that were added as part of the Expo Line project. Access upgrades were added in 2018 due to increased use and development of the area. Metro has held discussions regarding placing the station underground or expanding the light rail capacity in time for the 2028 Olympics.

North of this station is the Flower Street Tunnel, which connects Pico station to 7th St/Metro Center Station via Flower Street. The tunnel's portal is just south of 11th Street on Flower Street. The tunnel will be extended when the Regional Connector is completed in 2022.

Hours and frequency

Connections 
, the following connections are available:
 LADOT Commuter Express: *, *, *, *, *
 LADOT DASH: F
 Torrance Transit: 4X*
Note: * indicates commuter service that operates only during weekday rush hours.

Notable places nearby 
The station is within walking distance of the following notable places:
 California Hospital Medical Center
 Circa Complex
 Crypto.com Arena
 Fashion Institute of Design & Merchandising, Los Angeles Campus
 L.A. Live
 Los Angeles Convention Center
 Oceanwide Plaza

References 

A Line (Los Angeles Metro) stations
E Line (Los Angeles Metro) stations
J Line (Los Angeles Metro)
Los Angeles Metro Busway stations
South Park (Downtown Los Angeles)
Railway stations in the United States opened in 1990
Railway stations in Los Angeles
Buildings and structures in Downtown Los Angeles
1990 establishments in California
Bus stations in Los Angeles